Edna is a female given name originating from several languages. In Hebrew, it means "pleasure". Various women named Edna are referenced in the Old Testament apocryphal books Jubilees (where the wives of Enoch, Methuselah, and Terah are all so named) and Tobit. The name Edna may also be an Anglicized form of the Irish and Scottish name Eithne, meaning "kernel" in Gaelic. This was a very popular girl's name in the United States in the early 20th century, but has since become unfashionable. It is also a very rare surname. Edna, as derived from Hebrew, is closely related etymologically to the name Eden.

People with the given name Edna
 Edna Béjarano (born 1951), Israeli singer
 Edna Best (1900–1974), British actress
 Edna Deane (1905–1995), English ballroom dancer, choreographer and author
 Ednah Dow Littlehale Cheney (1824–1904), American writer, reformer, philanthropist
 Edna Cain Daniel (1875–1957), American journalist and publisher
 Edna Doré (1922–2014), British actress
 Edna Eicke (1919–1979), American illustrator
 Edna Ferber (1885–1968), American novelist
 Edna Indermaur (1892-1985), American contralto
 Edna Iturralde (born 1948), Ecuadorian author 
 Edna F. Kelly (1906–1997), American politician
 Edna Leedom (1896–1937), American actress
 Edna Lewis (1916–2006), African-American chef
 Edna Madzongwe (born 1943), Zimbabwean politician
 Edna Manley (1900–1987), Jamaican sculptor
 Dame Edna O'Brien (born 1930), Irish writer
Edna Pahewa (born 1954), New Zealand weaver
 Edna Dean Proctor (1829–1923), American poet
 Edna Purviance (1895–1958), American actress
 Edna St. Vincent Millay (1892–1950), American poet and playwright
 Edna Stern (born 1977), Belgian-Israeli pianist
 Edna Tichenor (1901–1965), American actress
 Edna Adan Ismail (Born 1937), Somali foreign Minister, Midwife, FGM abolitionist and former First first lady of Somaliland

Fictional characters
 Edna, maid of the Birlings in the play An Inspector Calls
 Edna, the Inebriate Woman, 1971 BBC TV drama
 Edna Birch in the television series Emmerdale
 Edna Braithwaite, a maid in Downton Abbey
 Dame Edna Everage
 Edna Garrett in the television series Diff'rent Strokes and The Facts of Life
 Edna Gee in the ITV soap opera Coronation Street in the 1970s
 Edna Krabappel in the television series The Simpsons
 Edna Mode, fictional fashion designer in the animated film The Incredibles
 Edna Pontellier in Kate Chopin's novel "The Awakening"
 Edna Spalding in the 1984 film Places in the Heart
 Edna Turnblad in the 1988 film Hairspray and subsequent adaptations as a stage musical and musical film

See also
Adna (given name), which is transliterated as "Edna" in the Douay–Rheims Bible

References

Hebrew feminine given names
Irish feminine given names
English feminine given names
Modern names of Hebrew origin